Craig Williams Jr. (born September 28, 1989) is an American professional basketball player for Sendai 89ers in Japan.

Career statistics 

|-
| align="left" | 2016-17
| align="left" | Ehime
|55 ||31 || 20.8 ||.456  || .363 ||.780  || 8.1 || 1.6 || 0.5 ||0.4  || 13.2
|-
| align="left" | 2017-18
| align="left" | Sendai
|60 ||35 || 24.7 ||.424  || .374 ||.800 || 8.7 || 2.8 || 0.6 ||0.6  || 13.8
|-

References

1989 births
Living people
American expatriate basketball people in Cyprus
American expatriate basketball people in Japan
American expatriate basketball people in Poland
American expatriate basketball people in Uruguay
Siarka Tarnobrzeg (basketball) players
Ehime Orange Vikings players
Sendai 89ers players
TCU Horned Frogs men's basketball players
Temple Owls men's basketball players
United States Virgin Islands men's basketball players
United States Virgin Islands expatriate sportspeople
American men's basketball players
Centers (basketball)
Power forwards (basketball)